Congenital hemolytic anemia refers to hemolytic anemia which is primarily due to congenital disorders.

Types
Basically classified by causative mechanism, types of congenital hemolytic anemia include:
 Genetic conditions of RBC Membrane
 Hereditary spherocytosis
 Hereditary elliptocytosis
 Genetic conditions of RBC metabolism (enzyme defects). This group is sometimes called congenital nonspherocytic (hemolytic) anemia, which is a term for a congenital hemolytic anemia without spherocytosis, and usually excluding hemoglobin abnormalities as well, but rather encompassing defects of glycolysis in the erythrocyte.
 Glucose-6-phosphate dehydrogenase deficiency (G6PD or favism)
 Pyruvate kinase deficiency
 Aldolase A deficiency
 Hemoglobinopathies/genetic conditions of hemoglobin
 Sickle cell anemia
 Congenital dyserythropoietic anemia
 Thalassemia

See also 
 Hematopoietic ulcer
 List of circulatory system conditions

References

External links 

Hereditary hemolytic anemias